Veermata Jijabai Bhosale Udyan, also known as the Byculla Zoo and formerly Victoria Gardens, is a zoo and garden covering 50 acres located at Byculla, in the heart of Mumbai, India. It is the oldest public garden in Mumbai.
After Indian independence it was Named after Jijamata, the mother of Shivaji, the first Maratha emperor. 

In 1835, British administration granted a large plot of land in Sewri to the Agro Horticultural Society of Western India for a botanical garden known as Victoria Gardens after Queen-Empress Victoria. That land was later acquired for a European burial ground. In 1861, construction of a new garden was commenced on 33 acres in the Mount Estate, Mazgaon (now included in Byculla). The flora from Sewri garden was transferred to this new garden named Jijamata Udyaan which was formally opened to the public by Lady Frere on 19 November 1862. Agro Horticultural Society of Western India continued to maintain Victoria Gardens till 1873 when the society's end led to the municipal corporation taking over the garden's upkeep.  In 1890 the garden was extended by 15 acres especially for the zoo.

The garden also houses the Dr. Bhau Daji Lad Museum, a staff building in Greco-Roman style erected in the memory of Lady Frere, an equestrian statue of King Edward VII of England made of black marble (originally installed near the University of Mumbai) known as Kala Ghoda and the David Sassoon clock tower.

Notes

External links
Official website of: "Central Zoo Authority of India" (CZA), Government of India

Parks in Mumbai
Zoos in Maharashtra
1861 establishments in British India
Zoos established in 1861